Kim On-A (born 6 September 1988) is a South Korean handball player who competed at the 2008 Summer Olympics, winning a bronze medal.  She also competed at the 2012 and 2016 Olympics.

References

External links
The Official Website of the Beijing 2008 Olympic Games

Living people
1988 births
South Korean female handball players
Handball players at the 2008 Summer Olympics
Handball players at the 2012 Summer Olympics
Handball players at the 2016 Summer Olympics
Olympic handball players of South Korea
Olympic bronze medalists for South Korea
Olympic medalists in handball
Medalists at the 2008 Summer Olympics
Handball players at the 2010 Asian Games
Handball players at the 2014 Asian Games
Handball players at the 2018 Asian Games
Asian Games gold medalists for South Korea
Asian Games bronze medalists for South Korea
Asian Games medalists in handball
Medalists at the 2010 Asian Games
Medalists at the 2014 Asian Games
Medalists at the 2018 Asian Games
Universiade medalists in handball
Universiade silver medalists for South Korea
Medalists at the 2015 Summer Universiade